Tarucus quadratus is a butterfly in the family Lycaenidae. It is found in Yemen (Socotra) and Somalia.

References

Butterflies described in 1899
Tarucus
Butterflies of Africa